"Cry of the Lonely" is a song by J.M. Silk, released as the final single taken from the album Hold on to Your Dream issued on RCA Records, in 1987.

The composition was written by Keith Nunnally and Steve "Silk" Hurley, and it reached at number fifty on the US Dance chart.

Credits and personnel
Keith Nunnally - lead vocal, writer
Steve Hurley - writer, producer, mix
Larry Sturm - producer, engineer
Phil Balsano - producer
Freddy Bastone - mix
Chep Nanez - edits

Official versions
"Cry of The Lonely (Radio Edit) - 4:10
"Cry of The Lonely (LP Version)" - 4:44
"Cry of The Lonely (Club-House Mix)" - 7:45
"Cry of The Lonely (Dub-House Mix)" - 7:20
"Cry of The Lonely (House-Of-Trix Mix) - 9:52

Charts and sales

Peak positions

See also
List of artists who reached number one on the US Dance chart

References

External links
 [ Steve "Silk" Hurley] on AllMusic
 [ J.M. Silk] on AllMusic

1987 singles
1986 songs
Steve "Silk" Hurley songs
Songs written by Steve "Silk" Hurley
Songs written by Keith Nunnally
RCA Records singles